Jim Courier defeated Carlos Costa in the final, 7–6(7–3), 6–0, 6–4 to win the men's singles tennis title at the 1992 Italian Open.

Emilio Sánchez was the defending champion, but lost in the third round to Michael Chang.

Seeds

  Jim Courier (champion)
  Pete Sampras (quarterfinals)
  Boris Becker (withdrew)
  Michael Stich (first round)
  Michael Chang (quarterfinals)
  Guy Forget (first round)
  Goran Ivanišević (first round)
  Petr Korda (semifinals)
  Ivan Lendl (second round)
  Alberto Mancini (third round)
  Emilio Sánchez (third round)
  Karel Nováček (first round)
  Aaron Krickstein (first round)
  Richard Krajicek (first round)
  Sergi Bruguera (third round)
  Alexander Volkov (first round)

Draw

 ''NB: The Final was the best of 5 sets.

Finals

Top half

Section 1

Section 2

Bottom half

Section 3

Section 4

External links
 ATP Singles draw

Men's Singles